Maria Virgínia Ferreira de Almeida Júdice Gamito Dignum (born 2 May 1964, in Lisbon, Portugal) is a Professor of Computer Science at Umeå University, and an Associated Professor at Delft University of Technology. She leads the Social and Ethical Artificial Intelligence research group. Her research and writing considers responsible AI and the development evaluation of human-agent team work, thereby aligning with Human-Centered Artificial Intelligence themes.

Education and early career 
After graduating from university of Lisbon in 1987, Dignum moved to Amsterdam where she completed a MSc in Computer  science at the Vrije Universiteit in 1989. She then worked in consultancy and system development. In 2003 Dignum returned to academic computer science and she earned her doctorate in computer science at Utrecht University in 2004. She was appointed as an associate professor at Delft University of Technology. She was made a Netherlands Organisation for Scientific Research Veni laureate in 2006 for her work in agent-based organisational frameworks.

Research 
She was made an associate professor at Delft University of Technology in 2009. In 2011 she was appointed Vice President of the Benelux Vereniging voor Kunstmatige Intelligentie (BNVKI), the Benelux Association for AI, a position she held until 2017.

In 2018 Dignum joined Umeå University as a Professor of AI and Society. Her research is supported by the Wallenberg AI, Autonomous Systems and Software Program. She is interested in the ethical and cultural impacts of artificial intelligence, and ways to make AI both optimised and transparent for the people who are impacted by it. She is a Fellow of the European Artificial Intelligence Association. She hopes that AI will not be seen as only a computer science discipline, but one which interacts with all academic areas.

Policy work 
She was appointed to the European Commission High Level Expert Group in Artificial Intelligence, in which she capacity she helps create guidelines and policy on the European Union AI strategy. The recommendations from the group are included in the European Commission's five-year plan, and will be part of the Multiannual Financial Framework up until 2027. In 2018 the group delivered the Ethical Guidelines of Artificial Intelligence as well as a series of recommendations to guide trustworthy AI. She serves on the board of AllAI, a collective of researchers bringing stakeholders together to monitor the usage of AI. In 2019 she was elected to the World Economic Forum Global AI Council. Dignum provides expert commentary on AI at conferences and public events.

Selected publications 
Her publications include;

Books

Papers

References 

Portuguese women computer scientists
Artificial intelligence researchers
Artificial intelligence ethicists
Utrecht University alumni
Academic staff of Umeå University
1964 births
Living people